Boggart Hole Brook is a river in Blackley, Manchester, England, which a tributary of the River Irk. It rises in Boggart Hole Clough, near the main lake, and has a length of just over a mile.

Boggart Hole Brook
Rivers of Manchester
2Boggart